The 2022 Kazakhstan Premier League was the 31st season of the Kazakhstan Premier League, the highest football league competition in Kazakhstan. FC Tobol were the defending champions after winning their second title the previous season.

Events
On 11 March, Shakhter Karagandy were awarded a 3-0 technical victory over Astana after Astana fielded seven Foreign Players on the pitch at the same time during their match on 5 March 2022.

Teams
FC Kaisar (relegated after five years in the top flight) and Zhetysu (relegated after four years in the top flight) were relegated at the end of the 2021 season. They were replaced by Aksu and Maktaaral from the Kazakhstan First League (both promoted to the top division for the first time in their history).

Team overview

Personnel and kits

Note: Flags indicate national team as has been defined under FIFA eligibility rules. Players and Managers may hold more than one non-FIFA nationality.

Foreign players
The number of foreign players is restricted to eight per KPL team. A team can use only five foreign players on the field in each game.
From the 2020 season, the KFF announced that players from countries of the Eurasian Economic Union would not be counted towards a club's foreign player limit.

For transfers during the season, see Winter 2021–22 transfers and Summer 2022 transfers.

In bold: Players that have been capped for their national team.

Managerial changes

Regular season

League table

Results

Results table

Results by match played

Positions by round

Statistics

Scoring
 First goal of the season: Billal Sebaihi for Maktaaral against Ordabasy

Top scorers

Hat-tricks

Clean sheets

Awards

Monthly awards

References

External links
Official website 

Kazakhstan Premier League seasons
1
Kazakh
Kazakh